The 2017 Asian Karate Championships were the 14th edition of the Asian Karate Championships, and were held in Astana, Kazakhstan from July 15 to July 16, 2017.

Medalists

Men

Women

Medal table

References
Results (Archived version)
Medal table

External links
 akf-karatedo.com

Asian Championships
Asian Karate Championships
Asian Karate Championships
Asian Karate Championships
Sport in Astana